The TVB Anniversary Awards, officially known as the TVB Awards Presentation, is an annual awards ceremony honoring TVB's programming achievements in Hong Kong television; despite claims that it is the region's equivalent to the American Emmy and the Australian Logie, no other networks are allowed to enter their programmes into TVB competition, and it is awarded solely to TVB programming. Winners are awarded a copy of the golden TVB anniversary statuette, which depicts a man and a woman holding up TVB's square logo. The TVB Anniversary Awards are only one of three (four, including Asian Television Awards) TVB awards given out. The other two types of TVB awards that are given out before the anniversary awards are: TVB Star Awards Malaysia and StarHub TVB Awards (Singapore). A list of all TVB awards winners is compiled here in the TVB Awards Winners Lists.

The awards for Best Drama, Best Actor, and Best Actress in a TVB drama series were first presented in 1997 as the final act for the TVB Anniversary Gala, a star-studded event held every year on 19 November, TVB's anniversary day. Several more award categories were introduced in the following years. In 2006, the event became a separate awards ceremony, and is usually given in November or December of that year, until 2019 when it is held in January of the following year. Carol Cheng has been hosting the awards ceremony since 2006.

Categories
Nominating and voting procedures have varied over the years. Winners are determined by a combination of results coming from a professional voting committee and the public.

Current categories

Discontinued categories

TV ratings
All results are derived from live viewership in Hong Kong, based on Nielsen ratings. Before 2013, audience membership was determined by CSM Media Research.

Award milestones
Carol Cheng is the first to have won a Golden Horse Award (Best Actress, 1988), a Hong Kong Film Award (Best Actress, 1991), and a TVB Anniversary Award (Best Actress, 2000). She has been the master of ceremonies for the TVB Anniversary Awards since 2006. In 2015, Anthony Wong became the second actor to achieve this milestone with his Best Actor win for Kiu Ngo-tin in Lord of Shanghai.
Charmaine Sheh has garnered 5 awards at TVB Anniversary Awards, more than any other individual (two wins for Best Actress and three wins for Most Popular Female Character). Sheh is tied with Liza Wang, Sheren Tang and Nancy Wu for most Best Actress wins. Sheh is also known for being:
The first individual to be touted as the "Double TV Queen", a recognition in which an actress wins Best Actress and Most Popular Female Character in the same year. Sheh is the only actress to receive this title two times.
The first actress to receive two nominations in the top 5 for Most Popular Female Character in the same year (2009). In 2012, Tavia Yeung became the second actress to achieve this milestone.
Gallen Lo is the first individual to win the same award for two consecutive years (Best Actor in 1997 and 1998).
Sheren Tang is the first actress to win the Best Actress for two consecutive years (in 2009 and 2010).
Bobby Au-yeung is the first TVB acting class alumnus to win Best Actor (2000).
Moses Chan is the first actor to be touted as "Double TV King", in 2007.
Wayne Lai is the first and only actor to have won three different awards in the same year: Best Actor, Most Popular Male Character, and tvb.com's Most Popular Artiste (2009).
Myolie Wu is the first and only actress to have won three different awards in the same year: Best Actress, Most Popular Female Character, and Most Extraordinary Elegant Female Artiste (2011).
Tavia Yeung is the first and only individual who have won awards in four different categories: Most Improved Female Artiste (2003), Best Supporting Actress (2008), Most Popular Female Character (2009), and Best Actress (2012).
Sheren Tang is the first individual from TVB acting class alumnus to win Best Actress (2009), followed by Tavia Yeung (2012) and Nancy Wu (2015).

Record holders

Most awards
Most awards won by a drama series:
War and Beauty won 9 awards in 2004, including:
My Favourite Actor in a Leading Role (Bowie Lam)
My Favourite Actress in a Leading Role (Gigi Lai)
My Favourite Powerhouse Actor (Chan Hung-lit)
My Favourite Powerhouse Actress (Sheren Tang)
My Top 12 Favourite TV Characters (Bowie Lam as Sun Bak-yeung)
My Top 12 Favourite TV Characters (Gigi Lai as Hongiya Yuk-ying)
My Top 12 Favourite TV Characters (Sheren Tang as Niuhuru Yu-yuet)
My Top 12 Favourite TV Characters (Moses Chan as Hung Mo)
My Top 12 Favourite TV Characters (Charmaine Sheh as Dongiya Yi-sun)
Most awards won by a male
Gallen Lo and Raymond Lam (7)
Most awards won by a female
Charmaine Sheh (10)

Acting records
Best Actor (TV King)

Double TV King
Refers to an actor who has won both Best Actor and Most Popular Male Character in a single year.
Moses Chan for Heart of Greed (2007)
Wayne Lai for Rosy Business (2009)
Kevin Cheng for Ghetto Justice (2011)

Best Actress (TV Queen)

Double TV Queen
Refers to an actress who has won both Best Actress and Most Popular Female Character in a single year.
Charmaine Sheh received this title 2 times. Once in 2006 for Maidens' Vow, and again in 2014 for Line Walker.
In 2011, Myolie Wu won Best Actress for Curse of the Royal Harem and Most Popular Female Character for Ghetto Justice.
In 2013, Kristal Tin won both awards for Brother's Keeper.

Best Supporting Actor

Best Supporting Actress

Most Popular Male Character

Most Popular Female Character

Most Improved Male Artiste

Most Improved Female Artiste

See also

List of Asian television awards

External links
TVB Anniversary Awards，YouTube 
Anniversary Awards  myTV SUPER

 
TVB
TVB original programming
Hong Kong television-related lists